Doughboy Hollow is the fourth album by Australian rock band Died Pretty. The album, recorded with English producer Hugh Jones, was released in 1991.

Described by Ian McFarlane's Encyclopedia of Australian Rock and Pop as "brimming with passionate, dramatic and alluring musical vistas", it took the band into the Top 20 album charts for the first time, peaking at No.19 in September 1991. The album led to three ARIA Award nominations in 1992—Album of the Year for Doughboy Hollow, Independent Single of the Year for "D.C." and Best Video, also for "D.C.". It was also included in the 2010 book 100 Best Australian Albums.

Lyrical content

Talking to Richard Kingsmill of Triple J in 1996, Ron S. Peno explained the lyrics of second single "D.C.": "The lyric is about the passing of someone, and coming to terms with it." He further elaborated: "Lyrically I wrote it about a dear friend that passed away while we were on tour in Europe. His name was David Cox—hence the "D.C." title. He was this wonderful person who came into my life, influenced me and left it again before his time." Peno agreed with Kingsmill's assessment that the song was "a bit of an anthem", stating that he "love[s] the song" because "it's straight from the heart".

Impact and legacy

Interviewed in 1996, five years after Doughboy Hollow'''s 1991 release, singer and co-writer Ron Peno said the album remained the band's creative watermark. "Now there's an album that should have done something," he told the Daily Telegraph. "It's a very loved album and I think it was a special record for us. I think it was criminal that it got ignored."

Thirty years after the album's release, Double J featured Doughboy Hollow on their weekly Classic Albums show in August 2021. Caz Tran reflected that "Doughboy Hollow should have made Died Pretty a household name", and that "its songs show the Sydney band at the peak of their creative powers." She concluded: "Thirty years on though, it is clear Doughboy Hollow'' occupies a special place in Australian music, popping up with stubborn consistency on essential albums lists to this day."

Named the 96th best Australian album by Rolling Stone Australia in 2021, they said, "More closely aligned with the overcast melodies of bands like R.E.M. and The Dream Syndicate, the Sydney ensemble were almost anti-grunge in their love of crystalline adornment and poetic melodrama. And most damning of all, singer Ron Peno rendered his tortured emotions through subtle delicacy rather than angsty outbursts."

Track listing
(All songs by Brett Myers and Ron Peno except where noted)
 "Doused" – 4:10
 "D.C." (Ron Peno, Steve Clark) – 4:33
 "Sweetheart"   – 4:13
 "Godbless" (Ron Peno, John Hoey) – 3:31
 "Satisfied" – 6:04
 "Stop Myself" – 3:34
 "Battle of Stanmore" – 2:19
 "The Love Song"  – 5:00
 "Disaster" – 3:54
 "Out in the Rain"– 4:21
 "Turn Your Head" – 5:19

Personnel

 Ron Peno — vocals
 Brett Myers — guitar
 John Hoey — keyboards
 Steve Clark — bass
 Chris Welsh — drums

Additional personnel
 Amanda Brown — violin ("The Love Song," "D.C.," "Battle of Stanmore")
 Sarah Peet — cello ("The Love Song," "D.C.," "Disaster")
 Sunil de Silva — percussion

References

1991 albums
Died Pretty albums
Albums produced by Hugh Jones (producer)